This is the 2005 THE–QS World University Rankings list of the top 200 universities in the world.

Top 200

Regional rankings (top 10)

Europe

References

University and college rankings
2005 in education